The Hong Kong Philatelic Society was established in 1921 and is the oldest philatelic organisation in Hong Kong. Members were mainly Europeans before the war and after 1946, more and more Chinese became members and the Society has grown in stature. Currently, the Society has over 350 local and overseas members.

History 
Formed to promote philatelic activities in Hong Kong, the Society once contributed a column in the South China Morning Post in the 1930s reporting on both local and foreign philatelic activities and developments. In the 1960s, it began holding open competitive exhibitions locally and published a monthly newsletter.

Journal 
The first annual journal of the Hong Kong Philatelic Society was inaugurated in 1997 and No. 20 was published in 2016

Affiliations 
The Society was one of the founding members of the Federation of Inter-Asian Philately (FIAP) and has been a member of the Federation Internationale de Philatelie (FIP) since the 1980s.

Participation in exhibitions 
Over the years, the Society has promoted philately vigorously in Hong Kong and organised the first national stamp exhibition in 1994, the first international stamp exhibition in February 1997 and the 15th FIAP Asian International in February 2001. In addition, the Hong Kong Philatelic Society has also organised national exhibitions such as Hongpex'96, Hongpex'98, Hongpex'00, Hong Kong Stampex 2002, 2003, 2005 and 2006 so that new exhibits formed by local collectors can qualify for future FIAP & FIP exhibitions. The Christopher D'Almada trophy is to be awarded as the grand prize for the Hongpex exhibitions. In December 2002, the Society together with the Hong Kong Study Circle (UK) organised the 140th Anniversary of Hong Kong Stamps Exhibition at the City Hall. In addition, the HKPS also participated in joint stamp exhibitions such as in Guangzhou, Macau and the most recent Hong Kong-Macau Joint Stamp Expo in October 2005. 
In January 2004, the Society co-organised the Hong Kong 2004 Stamp Expo - 17th Asian International Philatelic Exhibition which was another success. 
Two more FIAP Asian International Stamp exhibitions were organised by the Society supported by Hong Kong Post, namely HONG KONG 2009 and HONG KONG 2015.
Today, the Society is actively involved in raising local standard of exhibiting among adult and youth alike and members of the Society has achieved several Large Gold and Gold medals as well as Grand Prix Awards at stamp exhibitions.

External links

See also 
Hong Kong Study Circle
Postage stamps and postal history of Hong Kong

Philatelic organizations
Clubs and societies in Hong Kong
Philately of Hong Kong